Víctor Gael Bocanegra Villanueva (born 2 July 2002) is a Mexican footballer who currently plays as a midfielder for UAT.

Career statistics

Club

Notes

References

External links
 

2002 births
Living people
Mexican footballers
Association football midfielders
Correcaminos UAT footballers
Liga de Expansión MX players
Footballers from Tamaulipas
People from Ciudad Victoria
Liga Premier de México players
Tercera División de México players